Varanasi railway division is one of the three railway divisions under North Eastern Railway zone of Indian Railways. This railway division was formed on 1 May 1969 and its headquarter is located at Varanasi in the state of Uttar Pradesh of India.

Izzatnagar railway division (at Bareilly City) and Lucknow NER railway division are the other two railway divisions under NER Zone headquartered at Gorakhpur.

List of railway stations 
The list includes the stations under the Varanasi railway division and their station category.

Stations closed for Passengers -

References

 
Divisions of Indian Railways
1969 establishments in Uttar Pradesh